The 2022–23 Central Connecticut Blue Devils men's basketball team represented Central Connecticut State University in the 2022–23 NCAA Division I men's basketball season. The Blue Devils, led by 2nd-year head coach Patrick Sellers, played their home games at the William H. Detrick Gymnasium in New Britain, Connecticut as members of the Northeast Conference.

Previous season
The Blue Devils finished the 2021–22 season 8–24, 5–13 in NEC play to finish tied for eighth place. As the 9 seed, they defeated 8 seed Fairleigh Dickinson in the opening round of the NEC Tournament, before falling to top-seeded Bryant in the quarterfinals.

Roster

Schedule and results

|-
!colspan=12 style=| Regular season

|-
!colspan=9 style=| NEC Tournament

Sources

References

Central Connecticut Blue Devils men's basketball seasons
Central Connecticut Blue Devils
Central Connecticut Blue Devils men's basketball
Central Connecticut Blue Devils men's basketball